Erin Rafuse (born December 2, 1988 in Halifax, Nova Scotia) is a Canadian sailor. Along with partner Danielle Boyd, Rafuse finished in sixth place at the 2015 Pan American Games. Rafuse and Boyd also qualified to compete at the 2016 Summer Olympics in the 49erFX, finishing 16th.

References

External links
Official website

1988 births
Living people
Canadian female sailors (sport)
Olympic sailors of Canada
Sailors at the 2016 Summer Olympics – 49er FX
Pan American Games competitors for Canada
Sailors at the 2015 Pan American Games
Sportspeople from Halifax, Nova Scotia